Drama of the Ages is the third album by metal band Jacobs Dream and was released in 2005.  It is the first Jacobs Dream album to feature singer Chaz Bond on vocals.  The album contains an untitled hidden song on the final track which is an instrumental version of Pachelbel's Canon in D.

Track listing 
 "Drama of the Ages"  – 4:45
 "Keeper of the Crown"  – 4:57
 "Spinning Leaf"  – 4:51
 "Stand or Fall" – 5:09
 "Tempest"  – 5:13
 "Third Way"  – 4:44
 "Forever Winter"  – 6:11
 "Drowning Man"  – 4:59
 "Deceiver of the Nations" - 6:32
 "Cutting Words" - 5:53
 "Victory" - 4:55
 "At the Gates" - 6:47
 "Untitled" (Pachelbel's Canon in D) - 5:50

Credits
Chaz Bond - vocals
John Berry - guitars, synth, backing vocals
Jon Noble - guitar, backing vocals
James Evans - bass, backing vocals
Gary Holtzman - drums

References

Jacobs Dream albums
2005 albums